Vilangad  is a village in Kozhikode district in the state of Kerala, India. Vilangad is a small town, north-east of Kozhikode district bordering with Wayanad and Kannur. It is situated 32 km. away from sub-district headquarter Vatakara and 71 km. away from district headquarter Kozhikode.

History
Vilangad has been inhabited since 1942. St. George's High School Vilangad established in 1957.

Attractions

Thirikakkayam water falls 
Situated near to Chelekavu temple and 5 km. away from Vilangad. The fall will be flowing in full strength during monsoon

Vilangad mini hydroelectric project 
7.5-MW mini-hydroelectric project commissioned on 2014. The project consist of two small dams at Panom and Valook, two canals, a fore-bay tank, penstock, and three 2.5 MW generators

Pullippara 
It is an important trekking destination near Vilangad.

Transportation
Vilangad village connects to other parts of India through Vatakara city on the west and Kuttiady town on the east.  National highway No.66 passes through Vatakara and the northern stretch connects to Mangalore, Goa and Mumbai.  The southern stretch connects to Cochin and Trivandrum.  The eastern Highway  going through Kuttiady connects to Mananthavady, Mysore and Bangalore. The nearest airports are at Kannur and Kozhikode.  The nearest railway station is at Vatakara.

Village Data (State Census 2011)

References

Villages in Kozhikode district
Vatakara area